Leighton Buzzard railway station serves the towns of Leighton Buzzard and Linslade in the county of Bedfordshire and nearby areas of Buckinghamshire. Until the 1960s the station was the start of a branch to Dunstable and Luton, with a junction just north of the present station. The station has four platforms. Platforms 1 & 2 serve the fast lines and are used by Avanti West Coast services running non-stop to/from London Euston. Platforms 3 & 4 are served by slower London Northwestern railway services to/from London Euston.

Page's Park railway station, terminus for the Leighton Buzzard Light Railway (a narrow gauge heritage railway), is on the opposite side of the town.

History 
The line had originally been planned to pass through Buckingham but opposition from the Duke of Buckingham ensured that it forced east through Linslade. A station with two-facing platforms was opened a ¼-mile south of the Linslade tunnels. These are arranged unusually for a four track main line: the southbound slow line has a tunnel to itself as does the northbound fast line, however the northbound slow and southbound fast lines share a tunnel. This stems from the fact that the line was built as double-track and when quadrupled, the two extra lines could only be placed along both sides, as single-track tunnels.

In May 1848, the station became a junction when a branch line to Dunstable was opened. The new building had an imposing frontage featuring arched windows. Access to the Dunstable branch was controlled by Leighton No. 2 signal box situated to the north of the station, while the actual branch signals were controlled by the main line box to the south. In 1874, land was purchased to the south of the station alongside the Dunstable branch for the construction of goods sidings, which eventually became known as Wing Yard.

The LNWR was absorbed by the London, Midland and Scottish Railway in the 1923 railway grouping and, in 1927, it added a crossover between the fast and slow lines. This was to play a significant role in the derailment of Royal Scot No. 6114 "Coldstream Guardsman" at Linslade on 22 March 1931 when the driver took the crossover at 50–60 mph instead of the regulation 15 mph. There had been a diversion in place on the fast lines and the driver had missed the warning signals. The engine overturned and six people were killed, including the driver and fireman. The Scotland amateur football team was on the train, but remained unscathed.

In 1957–1958 the platform buildings were rebuilt and a concrete awning placed over the platform. At the entrance a larger booking / waiting hall, central heating, electric lighting and the cycle storage, parcels and loading bay were improved.

The Great Train Robbery of 1963 occurred just south of this station, at  near Ledburn, at a bridge on the southbound stretch towards Cheddington. Wing Yard was closed in February 1967 and it is now used as a car park, while the branch to Dunstable was closed from June. In 1989, the platforms were lengthened to accommodate 12-coach trains and a £1.8m project to rebuild the station was started.

Motive power depot
The London and North Western Railway opened a small motive power depot at the south end of the station in 1859. This was reroofed in 1957 but closed 5 November 1962 and was demolished.

Services

Current services 
All services at Leighton Buzzard are operated by London Northwestern Railway.

The typical off-peak service in trains per hour is:
 4 tph to London Euston (2 of these are stopping services, 1 calls at  only and 1 runs non-stop)
 2 tph to 
 2 tph to  via 

Former services

Connex South Central 
In June 1997, Connex South Central began operating services between Gatwick Airport and Rugby via the Brighton and West London Lines that called at Leighton Buzzard with Class 319s. It was cut back to terminate at Milton Keynes in December 2000 before being withdrawn in May 2002 due to capacity constraints on the West Coast Main Line while the latter was being upgraded.

Southern 
Southern reintroduced the service in February 2009 with Class 377s operating initially operating from Brighton to Milton Keynes before being curtailed at its southern end at South Croydon and later Clapham Junction. In May 2022, Southern cut the service back to terminate at Watford Junction, where passengers for Leighton Buzzard may transfer to a London Northwestern service.

Interchange
Leighton Buzzard station is served by several local buses. The F70 bus route, operated by Arriva Shires & Essex, provides a direct Bus rapid transit service to  via the Luton to Dunstable Busway, with an onward connection to Luton Airport and also to Milton Keynes. The F77 bus route, also operated by Arriva, provides the same service to Luton and also a service to Bletchley.

Reinstating the connection to Luton
There have been past proposals about reopening the former line to Dunstable as either a rail link or as a guided busway, before little of its route had been lost to new construction,  Although there is now a guided busway between Dunstable and Luton, much of the Leighton Buzzard to Dunstable section was lost to the Leighton Buzzard Southern Bypass road.

Accidents and incidents
On 22 March 1931, a passenger train was derailed due to excessive speed through a crossover.  Six people were killed.

References

Sources

External links 

Railway stations in Bedfordshire
Former London and Birmingham Railway stations
Railway stations in Great Britain opened in 1859
1931 disasters in the United Kingdom
Railway stations served by West Midlands Trains
Leighton Buzzard
DfT Category C2 stations
Stations on the West Coast Main Line